Víctor Rivera (born May 25, 1944) is a retired Puerto Rican professional wrestler. Between 1967 and 1981, he held the NWA Americas Tag Team Championship 12 times, the NWA Americas Heavyweight Championship five times, the WWF International Tag Team Championship, and numerous other titles.

Professional wrestling career
In the late 1960s, Rivera wrestled in Los Angeles' Worldwide Wrestling Associates (which later became NWA Hollywood Wrestling in 1968), where he won the WWA World Tag Team Championship with Pedro Morales.

In December 1969, Rivera teamed with Tony Marino at Madison Square Garden to win the WWWF International Tag Team Championship in 2 straight falls from Professor Toru Tanaka and Mitsu Arakawa. Rivera and Marino defended the belts successfully against teams like Killer Kowalski and Waldo Von Erich, as well as Kowalski & Krippler Karl Kovacs. They lost the championship against another undefeated team, The Mongols (Bepo and Geto Mongol) on June 15, 1970, 2 falls to 1 at Madison Square Garden. On May 13, 1975, Rivera and Dominic DeNucci won the WWWF World Tag Team Championship from The Valiant Brothers. That same year, he also teamed with a rookie Dino Bravo to challenge The Mongols (Geto & Bolo Mongol) for the IWA World Tag Team Championship.

After leaving the WWF, he feuded with Pedro Morales in Hawaii and California. In 1978 Rivera returned to the WWWF as a heel under manager "Classy" Freddie Blassie and challenged Bob Backlund for the WWWF title in several cities, including at the Philadelphia Spectrum. Rivera left the WWWF again in 1979, and return for a match in 1989. In 1980, Rivera was once again wrestling in Los Angeles. In the National Wrestling Alliance, he won the NWA World Tag Team Championship with Enforcer Luciano.

Championships and accomplishments
All-California Championship Wrestling
ACCW Heavyweight Championship (3 times)
California Pro Wrestling
CPW Heavyweight Championship (1 time)
CPW Brass Knuckles Championship (2 times)
Hollywood Wrestling
NWA World Tag Team Championship (Los Angeles version) (1 time) - with Enforcer Lusciano
NWA Americas Heavyweight Championship (6 times)
NWA Americas Tag Team Championship (13 times) - with Pedro Morales (2), Raul Reyes (1), Raul Mata (1), Porkchop Cash (1), Dino Bravo (1), Cien Caras (1), Terry Sawyer (1), Chavo Guerrero (1), Texas Red (1), Allen Coage (2), Salvatore Bellomo (1),
NWA "Beat the Champ" Television Championship (2 times)
National Wrestling Federation 
NWF Heavyweight Championship (1 time)
Western States Alliance
WSA Heavyweight Championship (1 time)
WSA Beat The Champ Championship (1 time)
WSA Tag Team Championship (1 time) - with John Tolos
World Wrestling Federation
WWF International Tag Team Championship (1 time) - with Tony Marino
WWWF World Tag Team Championship (1 time) - with Dominic DeNucci

References

Living people
People from San Lorenzo, Puerto Rico
Puerto Rican male professional wrestlers
1944 births
20th-century professional wrestlers
NWF Heavyweight Champions
NWA "Beat the Champ" Television Champions
NWA Americas Tag Team Champions
NWA Americas Heavyweight Champions